Exhibition Stadium is a multi-purpose stadium located in Chilliwack, British Columbia. It is the home of the Fraser Valley Huskers of the Canadian Junior Football League. It is one of the few stadiums with covered seating in the country that has a playing field with no running track around it. The stadium seats 2,500.

External links
 Satellite view of Exhibition Stadium on Google Maps

Canadian football venues in British Columbia
Soccer venues in British Columbia
Sport in Chilliwack
Sports venues in British Columbia
Multi-purpose stadiums in British Columbia